Norðlýsið is a Faroese newspaper, which has a mainly local northern focus on its news.

References
Norðlýsið

Publications with year of establishment missing
Newspapers published in the Faroe Islands